Ochlerotatus is a genus of mosquito. Until 2000, it was ranked as a subgenus of Aedes, but after Reinert's work, the clade was upgraded to the level of a genus. This change has resulted in the renaming of many subgenus species, and many aedini-related taxa are undergoing taxonomic revisions. Some authors are still using traditional taxonomic names in their publications.

Taxonomy
Ochlerotatus was originally established as a genus in 1891. In 1917, a researcher by the name of Edwards transferred it to the aedine subgenus; however, as of 2000, Ochlerotatus has resumed its role as a genus (a revision made by Reinhert, due to common traits in genitalia).   Based on taxonomic characteristics, many species and subgenera of Aedes mosquitoes have been transferred to the Ochlerotatus genus.

After a contentious worldwide debate regarding the effect the taxonomic changes would have on names established over decades of work in scientific, government, and lay communities, many scientists and others affected by the change espoused the continued use of the previously established names. As of 2016, the previously established names are supported by and accepted for publication in many scientific journals.

Species
As of 2022, Ochlerotatus has the following species:

Aedes aboriginis -northwest coast mosquito
Aedes abserratus 
Aedes aculeatus 
Aedes aenigmaticus 
Aedes akkeshiensis 
Aedes albifasciatus 
Aedes albineus 
Aedes aloponotum 
Aedes amateuri 
Aedes ambreensis 
Aedes andersoni 
Aedes angustivittatus 
Aedes annulipes 
Aedes antipodeus 
Aedes arundinariae 
Aedes atactavittatus 
Aedes atlanticus 
Aedes auratus 
Aedes aurifer 
Aedes behningi 
Aedes bejaranoi 
Aedes berlandi 
Aedes bimaculatus 
Aedes biskraensis 
Aedes bogotanus 
Aedes breedensis 
Aedes burjaticus 
Aedes burpengaryensis 
Aedes caballus 
Aedes cacozelus 
Aedes calcariae 
Aedes calumnior 
Aedes campestris 
Aedes camptorhynchus 
Aedes canadensis -       woodland pool mosquito
Aedes cantans 
Aedes cantator  - brown saltmarsh mosquito
Aedes caspius 
Aedes cataphylla 
Aedes chelli 
Aedes churchillensis 
Aedes clelandi 
Aedes clivis 
Aedes coluzzii 
Aedes comitatus 
Aedes communis 
Aedes condolescens 
Aedes continentalis 
Aedes crinifer 
Aedes cunabulanus 
Aedes cyprioides 
Aedes cyprius 
Aedes dahlae 
Aedes decticus 
Aedes deficiens 
Aedes detritus 
Aedes diantaeus 
Aedes dorsalis 
Aedes dufouri 
Aedes duplex 
Aedes dupreei 
Aedes dzeta 
Aedes edgari 
Aedes eidsvoldensis 
Aedes eucephalaeus 
Aedes euedes 
Aedes euiris 
Aedes euplocamus 
Aedes excrucians 
Aedes explorator 
Aedes fitchii 
Aedes flavescens 
Aedes flavifrons 
Aedes fulvus 
Aedes grossbecki 
Aedes gutzevichi 
Aedes hakusanensis 
Aedes harrisoni 
Aedes hastatus 
Aedes hesperonotius 
Aedes hexodontus 
Aedes hodgkini 
Aedes hokkaidensis 
Aedes hungaricus 
Aedes imperfectus 
Aedes impiger 
Aedes implicatus 
Aedes incomptus 
Aedes increpitus 
Aedes inexpectatus 
Aedes infirmatus 
Aedes intermedius 
Aedes intrudens 
Aedes jacobinae 
Aedes jorgi 
Aedes juppi 
Aedes kasachstanicus 
Aedes lasaensis 
Aedes lepidus 
Aedes leucomelas 
Aedes linesi 
Aedes longifilamentus 
Aedes luteifemur 
Aedes macintoshi 
Aedes martineti 
Aedes mcdonaldi 
Aedes melanimon 
Aedes meprai 
Aedes mercurator 
Aedes milleri 
Aedes mitchellae 
Aedes montchadskyi 
Aedes nevadensis 
Aedes nigrinus 
Aedes nigripes 
Aedes nigrithorax 
Aedes nigrocanus 
Aedes nigromaculis 
Aedes niphadopsis 
Aedes nivalis 
Aedes normanensis 
Aedes nubilus 
Aedes obturbator 
Aedes oligopistus 
Aedes patersoni 
Aedes pectinatus 
Aedes pennai 
Aedes perkinsi 
Aedes pertinax 
Aedes phaecasiatus 
Aedes phaeonotus 
Aedes pionips 
Aedes procax 
Aedes pseudonormanensis 
Aedes pulcritarsis 
Aedes pullatus 
Aedes punctodes 
Aedes punctor 
Aedes purpuraceus 
Aedes purpureifemur 
Aedes purpuriventris 
Aedes ratcliffei 
Aedes raymondi 
Aedes rempeli 
Aedes rhyacophilus 
Aedes riparioides 
Aedes riparius 
Aedes sagax 
Aedes sallumae 
Aedes sapiens 
Aedes scapularis 
Aedes schizopinax 
Aedes schtakelbergi 
Aedes scutellatum 
Aedes sedaensis 
Aedes sergievi 
Aedes serratus 
Aedes shannoni 
Aedes silvestris 
Aedes simanini 
Aedes sinkiangensis 
Aedes sollicitans  saltmarsh mosquito
Aedes spencerii 
Aedes spilotus 
Aedes squamiger  - California saltmarsh mosquito
Aedes sticticus  - floodwater mosquito
Aedes stigmaticus 
Aedes stimulans  - woodland mosquito
Aedes stramineus 
Aedes stricklandi 
Aedes subalbirostris 
Aedes surcoufi 
Aedes synchytus 
Aedes taeniorhynchus  - black salt marsh mosquitto
Aedes tahoensis 
Aedes thelcter 
Aedes theobaldi 
Aedes thibaulti 
Aedes tormentor 
Aedes tortilis 
Aedes trivittatus 
Aedes turneri 
Aedes upatensis 
Aedes ventrovittis 
Aedes vigilax 
Aedes vittiger 
Aedes washinoi

References

External links

 
Mosquito genera